Wilson's Inheritance is a historic home  and farm complex located at Union Bridge, Carroll County, Maryland, United States. The complex includes the 1832-38 farmhouse, a bank barn, blacksmith shop, washhouse, smokehouse, chicken houses, sheds, and a privy. The brick house features an "L"-shaped plan, stone foundation, gable roof, ornamentation, and its siting into a slope.

Wilson's Inheritance was listed on the National Register of Historic Places in 1985.

References

External links
, including photo from 1984, at Maryland Historical Trust

Houses on the National Register of Historic Places in Maryland
Houses in Carroll County, Maryland
Houses completed in 1837
Union Bridge, Maryland
National Register of Historic Places in Carroll County, Maryland